Hedda Gabler is a 1920 Italian silent drama film directed by Gero Zambuto and Giovanni Pastrone. It is based on the 1890 play Hedda Gabler by Henrik Ibsen.

Cast
Italia Almirante Manzini as Hedda Gabler
Ettore Piergiovanni as Erberto Lovborg
Oreste Bilancia as Giorgio Tessmann
Diana D'Amore as Tea
Vittorio Rossi Pianelli as Brak
Letizia Quaranta as Edith
Léonie Laporte as zia Giulia
Gabriel Moreau

References

Bibliography
 Goble, Alan. The Complete Index to Literary Sources in Film. Walter de Gruyter, 1999.

External links

1920 films
Italian films based on plays
1920s Italian-language films
Films based on works by Henrik Ibsen
Films directed by Giovanni Pastrone
Films directed by Gero Zambuto
Italian silent feature films
Italian black-and-white films
Italian drama films
1920 drama films
Silent drama films
1920s Italian films